Muteremoana Aiatu (born 11 August 1981) is a former New Zealand rugby union player.

Aiatu was named in the Black Ferns squad for their end of year tour of England. She made her debut and only appearance for New Zealand on 29 November 2011 against England at Esher. Aiatu was named in the third and final test but did not play.

References

External links 

 Black Ferns Profile

1981 births
Living people
New Zealand female rugby union players
New Zealand women's international rugby union players